The Grain Futures Act (ch. 369) is a United States federal law enacted September 21, 1922 involving the regulation of trading in certain commodity futures, and causing the establishment of the Grain Futures Administration, a predecessor organization to the Commodity Futures Trading Commission.

The bill that became the Grain Futures Act was introduced in the United States Congress two weeks after the US Supreme Court declared the Futures Trading Act of 1921 unconstitutional in Hill v. Wallace 259 U.S. 44 (1922).  The Grain Futures Act was held to be constitutional by the US Supreme Court in Board of Trade of City of Chicago v. Olsen 262 US 1 (1923).

In 1936 it was revised into the Commodity Exchange Act (CEA). The act was further superseded in 1974 by establishing the Commodity Futures Trading Commission. In 1982 the Commodity Futures Trading Commission created the National Futures Association (NFA).

See also
National Futures Association
Commodity Exchange Act
Commodity Futures Trading Commission
Futures exchange
Futures contract

References

External links
 US CODE--TITLE 7
 

Commodity markets in the United States
United States federal commodity and futures legislation
1922 in law
1922 in the United States
Grain trade